"Who Do You Love?" is a song by Irish singer-songwriter Ryan O'Shaughnessy, written by Frances Mitchell and Mark Graham, released in Ireland on 2 August 2013. The song entered the Irish Singles Chart at number 3, making it his second Top 5 single in Ireland.

Track listing

Chart performance

Weekly charts

Release history

References

Ryan O'Shaughnessy songs
2013 singles
2013 songs